Alexander Domínguez Carabalí (born 5 June 1987) is an Ecuadorian professional footballer who plays as a goalkeeper  for Liga PRO Ecuador club  LDU Quito and the Ecuador national team.

Club career

LDU Quito
Domínguez played for L.D.U. Quito from 2006 to 2016, taking over the starting spot from José Francisco Cevallos. He won two Ecuadorian Serie A titles, the 2009 Copa Sudamericana, the 2009 Recopa Sudamericana and the 2010 Recopa Sudamericana.

Domínguez is one of the top 300 goalkeepers in the world, the third highest ranked Ecuadorian, and the highest ranked active Ecuadorian in terms of time spent without conceding a goal. From 2 September 2007 to 28 October 2007, he went 719 minutes without conceding a goal. He is nicknamed "Dida", after the Brazilian keeper of the same name.

Monterrey
On 22 June 2016, it was confirmed that Domínguez would be joining Monterrey.

Cerro Largo
Dominguez joined Uruguayan club Cerro Largo as a free agent on 20 August 2021. He played his first league match on 13 September 2021.

International career
Domínguez is a former Ecuadorian youth international, who represented the country at the 2007 South American U-20 Championship.

Domínguez received his first call-ups for the senior Ecuador national football team in May 2010 for friendlies against Mexico and South Korea. However, he remained an unused substitute. Because of club-related commitments, he would not receive another call-up until February 2011 for a friendly against Honduras. Again, he was an unused substitute. Manager Reinaldo Rueda finally gave Domínguez his first cap on 26 March 2011 in a 2–0 friendly defeat to Colombia. At the 2011 Copa América, he served as back-up to Marcelo Elizaga.

He established himself as Ecuador's first choice goalkeeper during the 2014 FIFA World Cup qualifying campaign, making 12 appearances for La Tri.

In June 2014, Domínguez was named in Ecuador's squad for the 2014 FIFA World Cup. On 15 June, he made his FIFA World Cup debut in a 2–1 defeat to Switzerland at the Estádio Nacional Mané Garrincha in Brasília.

On 25 June 2014, Domínguez was named Man of the Match vs. France in Ecuador's final match at the 2014 FIFA World Cup. Domínguez kept a clean sheet and stopped shots from the likes of Karim Benzema, Paul Pogba, and Olivier Giroud.

Honors
L.D.U. Quito
Serie A: 2007, 2010
Recopa Sudamericana: 2009, 2010
Copa Sudamericana: 2009

References

External links
Domínguez's FEF player card 

1987 births
Living people
Ecuadorian footballers
Ecuador international footballers
L.D.U. Quito footballers
C.F. Monterrey players
Club Atlético Colón footballers
Club Atlético Vélez Sarsfield footballers
Ecuadorian Serie A players
Liga MX players
Argentine Primera División players
Association football goalkeepers
2011 Copa América players
2014 FIFA World Cup players
2015 Copa América players
Copa América Centenario players
2019 Copa América players
2021 Copa América players
Ecuadorian expatriate footballers
Expatriate footballers in Mexico
Ecuadorian expatriate sportspeople in Mexico
Expatriate footballers in Argentina
Ecuadorian expatriate sportspeople in Argentina
People from Esmeraldas Province
2022 FIFA World Cup players